Walter Hervey may refer to:

 Walter Lowrie Hervey (1862–1952), American educator
Walter Hervey (mayor), Mayor of London 1271–1273